Ludwika Chewińska (born 9 October 1948) is a Polish athlete. She competed in the women's shot put at the 1972 Summer Olympics.

References

External links
 

1948 births
Living people
Athletes (track and field) at the 1972 Summer Olympics
Polish female shot putters
Olympic athletes of Poland
Place of birth missing (living people)